Piotr Balcerzak (born 25 June 1975 in Warsaw) is a former Polish sprint athlete. He achieved the most success with the Polish 4 x 100 meters relay.

He is married to another Polish sprinter, Joanna Niełacna.

Competition record

Personal bests
Outdoor
100m – 10.15 (1999 Kraków)
150m – 15.61 (2002 Bielsko-Biała)
200m – 20.72 (1999 Pátra, 2000 Kraków)

Indoor
60m – 6.62 (2000 Spała)
200m – 21.47 (2000 Spała)

References

1975 births
Living people
Polish male sprinters
Athletes from Warsaw
Athletes (track and field) at the 2000 Summer Olympics
Olympic athletes of Poland
European Athletics Championships medalists
Skra Warszawa athletes
21st-century Polish people